Clarence S. Wadsworth (1871–1941) was a businessman and philanthropist in New York City and Middletown, Connecticut. He is notable for building the Wadsworth Mansion at Long Hill and donating the land to create Wadsworth Falls State Park.

References

1871 births
1941 deaths
American businesspeople
American philanthropists